is a Japanese digital collectible card game released by Fujimi Shobo and Media Factory, two brand companies of Kadokawa Corporation. It was first announced in 2013. The franchise theme song is by L.I.N.K.s, a group composed of the voice actresses Yūka Aisaka, Mai Ishihara, Yoshiko Ikuta, Rie Takahashi, and Nozomi Yamamoto.

A manga series titled Ange Vierge Linkage by Mako Komao with art by Sakaki Yoshioka was serialized in Fujimi Shobo's shōnen manga magazine Monthly Dragon Age between 2014 and 2015, and was collected in two tankōbon volumes.

A mobile game titled  was released on December 18, 2013. The game will end service on December 20, 2021.

On April 20, 2017, Kadokawa announced that further development of the trading card game has been discontinued. A final tournament took place in May 2017, with the franchise's tournaments and campaigns ending at the end of June 2017. The franchise's website shut down on March 31, 2018.

Characters

Main characters

A former high school student from the Blue World and the main protagonist. Though she is emotional, she is also brave and supportive when the situation calls for it. Before gaining her powers she was a completely normal high school student who barely had any kind of presence. She uses a lightsword in combat.

A mature vampire girl from the Black World. She fights using blood but at the same time she thinks that feeding on others is embarrassing, and thus has not bitten anyone yet. However, after drinking Saya's blood in a desperate situation, she becomes completely attached to her and is able to use her full powers.

An extremely friendly and energetic angel from the Red World. She is able to become friends with anyone. Her ability is to borrow abilities from her friends, but it only works if there is a mutual bond between them.

A heterochromic android from the White World. She has a passion for speed and wants to become even faster than before. Her ability is to manipulate acceleration.

A busty and mature girl from the Green World. She has the reflexes of a soldier (as she is an ex-squad leader) but is also quite carefree and hates trouble. She is also very lazy, always trying to find excuses to avoid working. She feels guilty for what happened to Eins, as she was the one leader of her squad during the time the accident happened.

The alpha-driver for Saya's team from the Blue World. Extremely clumsy and goofy yet also kindhearted and optimistic, Amane is the central point for the girls' motives, and each of their episodes shows just how they met and become friends with her. She loves teasing her friends, but is also easily hurt despite her carefree attitude. After episode 3, she is sealed within a crystal made by the Ouroboros.

Other characters

Saya's upperclassman and one of the strongest fighters in the academy.

Almaria's upperclassman from the Black World. She likes teasing Almaria for the fact that she thinks that sucking blood is a very embarrassing act.

A fairy from the Red World.

An android from the White World.

A soldier from the Green World. She is the younger sister of Ageha who is quite airheaded and a bit immature but loves her sister very much. Unlike her sister, she is lazy and hates work.

Saya's upperclassman from the Blue World. She is a samurai-like girl who has mastered the ways of swordsmanship, and is quite strict towards her underclassmen.

Elel's upperclassman and an angel as well. Though she has only one wing and can't use her other eye as well, she is extremely kind and optimistic.

Stella's upperclassman. She adores her younger sister, Xenia, more than anything.

Carene's younger sister and an android taking a little girl's form. She is also Yufiria's mother.

An enhanced soldier, Expend, from the Green World and a top-rated soldier. She always has an emotionless look on her face and talks in monotone, but is quite arrogant and loves thinking about the world's destruction and just destruction in general. She used to be an energetic and hardworking rookie in Nya's squad until she had to be abandoned and was then modified even more, resulting her in becoming what she is now.

Mayuka's older sister and though she is serious and acts like a drill sergeant towards her, she is shown to love her very much.

Media

Anime
An anime television series adaptation by Silver Link and Connect aired from July 9 to September 24, 2016. Crunchyroll streamed the anime on its website. The opening theme is "Love is My Rail" by Konomi Suzuki, and the ending theme is "Link with U" by Yūka Aisaka, Mai Ishihara, Yoshiko Ikuta, Rie Takahashi, and Nozomi Yamamoto under the name L.I.N.K.s. On February 16, 2017, a 26-year-old man was arrested on charges of violating the Copyright Act because he subtitled the anime in Chinese, distributing it via file sharing software.

Episode list

Video games
A mobile game titled Ange Vierge: Girls Battle was released on December 17, 2013. It ended service on December 20, 2021.

Notes

References

External links
 
 

2014 video games
2017 disestablishments in Japan
Android (operating system) games
Anime television series based on video games
Connect (studio)
Crunchyroll anime
Digital collectible card games
Fujimi Shobo manga
IOS games
Japan-exclusive video games
Kadokawa Dwango franchises
Manga based on video games
Sega video games
Shōnen manga
Silver Link
Video games developed in Japan